Dženan Zajmović (born 11 November 1994) is a Bosnian professional footballer who plays as a forward.

Career
After spells in Croatia and with Bosnian powerhouse Željezničar, Zajmović moved abroad again in September 2020, when he signed with Romanian top tier side Poli Iași. On 2 June 2021, Bosnian Premier League club Velež Mostar announced Zajmović's arrival to the club. He left Velež in January 2023.

Honours
Željezničar
Bosnian Cup: 2017–18

Velež Mostar
Bosnian Cup: 2021–22

References

External links
Dženan Zajmović at Sofascore

1994 births
Living people
Footballers from Antwerp
Association football forwards
Bosnia and Herzegovina footballers
NK Lokomotiva Zagreb players
NK Sesvete players
NK Travnik players
FK Željezničar Sarajevo players
FC Politehnica Iași (2010) players
FK Velež Mostar players
Croatian Football League players
First Football League (Croatia) players
Premier League of Bosnia and Herzegovina players
First League of the Federation of Bosnia and Herzegovina players
Liga I players
Bosnia and Herzegovina expatriate footballers
Expatriate footballers in Croatia
Bosnia and Herzegovina expatriate sportspeople in Croatia
Expatriate footballers in Romania
Bosnia and Herzegovina expatriate sportspeople in Romania